The La Cañada Unified School District is located in the city of La Cañada Flintridge, in Los Angeles County, southern California. The La Cañada Unified School District is a high performing TK-12 public school district which operates three elementary schools, and one combined junior/senior high school. All three elementary schools and middle/high school combined serve approximately 4000 students.

Every one of the schools has been named a California Distinguished School. La Cañada High School and La Cañada Elementary School have been named a National Blue Ribbon School. La Cañada High School 7/8 has been named a 2014 "Schools to Watch - Taking Center Stage" Middle School.

The Governing Board is composed of five members, each elected to serve a four-year term. The past election took place in November 2017, but with the passage of California's Senate Bill 415, it will be effective in November 2020 to coincide with the Los Angeles County supervisors, the California State Senate and Assembly and US House and Senate general election.

Schools
The schools operated by the district are:

La Cañada High School which is split into two separate schools: 7-8 and 9-12
La Cañada Elementary School (K-6)
Palm Crest Elementary School (K-6)
Paradise Canyon Elementary School (K-6)

External links
 Official La Cañada Unified School District Website

School districts in Los Angeles County, California
La Cañada Flintridge, California
1885 establishments in California